Carl Peter Stoltenberg (28 January 1770 – 13 November 1830) was a Norwegian merchant, ship owner and politician. He was a representative at the Norwegian Constituent Assembly in Eidsvoll during 1814.

Biography
Carl Peter Stoltenberg was born in Våle (now Re) in Vestfold,  Norway. His father was a vicar. He belonged to a well established merchandising  family. Three of his uncles ran the business in Tønsberg, and then all died without leaving close heirs to assume control.  As a consequence, Stoltenberg inherited the family's mercantile business at age twenty. He expanded the business into both wholesale  and retail. He also extended his business into shipping.  In 1819, he took over the  Vallø saltworks, however an economic crisis in 1830 put his estate into bankruptcy.
 
He represented the city of Tønsberg at the Norwegian Constituent Assembly at Eidsvoll in 1814, and later a member of the Parliament of Norway.
At the National Assembly at Eidsvoll, he sat in the Finance Committee and belonged to the independence party (Selvstendighetspartiet). Stoltenberg was a member of Parliament from 1815 to 1816, setting on the committees for financial,  banking and mining. 

He was married to his cousin Karen Mathea Krefting Bull (1775–1859) and was the father of painter Matthias Stoltenberg.

Memorials
Both Stoltenbergs gate (Stoltenberg Street) and Stoltenbergparken (Stoltenberg Park) in Tønsberg were named in his honor.

References

Related Reading
 Holme Jørn (2014) De kom fra alle kanter - Eidsvollsmennene og deres hus  (Oslo: Cappelen Damm) 

1770 births
1830 deaths
Politicians from Tønsberg
Norwegian merchants
18th-century Norwegian businesspeople
Norwegian businesspeople in shipping
Fathers of the Constitution of Norway
19th-century Norwegian businesspeople
Carl Peter